KPIM-LP (102.9 FM) is a low-power FM radio station licensed to Broken Arrow, Oklahoma, United States. The station is currently owned by Broken Arrow Catholic Radio, Inc.

History
The station call sign KPIM-LP on February 14, 2014.

Translators

References

External links
 
 
 
 http://www.stmichaelradio.com

PIM-LP
Radio stations established in 2014
2014 establishments in Oklahoma
PIM-LP
Broken Arrow, Oklahoma
Catholic radio stations
Catholic Church in Oklahoma